The Antarang – Sex Health Information Art Gallery, also known as the Antarang Museum, was dedicated to educating the young and old about the human body, sexuality and AIDS. It was the only museum of its kind in South Asia. The museum was founded in Mumbai in 2002 as a result of the joint efforts of the Municipal Corporation of Greater Mumbai (MCGM) and the Mumbai District Aids Control Society (MDACS) & Dr Prakash Sarang following an increase in AIDS cases. In 2008, the museum made plans to move to the tourist town of Goa where Sarang believes its mission will be better received. However, as of 2013 it was still closed and seemed unlikely to reopen.

The museum's collection includes a visual display of the reproductive process, safe sex props and several full-blown images of sexually transmitted diseases (STDs). In addition, 20 sculptures form part of the exhibition that educates visitors about the human form, sexual intercourse and AIDS. The free museum taught local groups about sex education and its regular client base grew to include prostitutes and their clients.

References

Museums in Mumbai
2002 establishments in Maharashtra
Science museums in India
Sex museums
Sexuality in India